Fritz Köppen (born 28 June 1935 in Charlottenburg) is a German former long jumper who competed in the 1960 Summer Olympics.

References

1935 births
Living people
German male long jumpers
Olympic athletes of the United Team of Germany
Athletes (track and field) at the 1960 Summer Olympics